New York City's 2nd City Council district is one of 51 districts in the New York City Council. It has been represented by Democrat Carlina Rivera since 2018, succeeding term-limited fellow Democrat Rosie Méndez.

Geography
District 2 is based in Manhattan's Lower East Side and East Village, also covering the neighborhoods of Alphabet City, Gramercy Park, Kips Bay, Loisaida, Murray Hill, and Rose Hill.

The district overlaps with Manhattan Community Boards 2, 3, 5, and 6, and with New York's 7th and 12th congressional districts. It also overlaps with the 26th, 27th, and 28th districts of the New York State Senate, and with the 65th, 66th, 73rd, 74th, and 75th districts of the New York State Assembly.

Although it is majority-white, the district has a large Hispanic population concentrated in the Loisaida neighborhood. Since 1991, the district has been represented by four consecutive Hispanic councilmembers, three of whom have also been gay.

Recent election results

2021

In 2019, voters in New York City approved Ballot Question 1, which implemented ranked-choice voting in all local elections. Under the new system, voters have the option to rank up to five candidates for every local office. Voters whose first-choice candidates fare poorly will have their votes redistributed to other candidates in their ranking until one candidate surpasses the 50 percent threshold. If one candidate surpasses 50 percent in first-choice votes, then ranked-choice tabulations will not occur.

2017

2013

Previous councilmembers
The district is a safe Democratic district. Between 1974 and 1991, it was represented by Miriam Friedlander, who was narrowly defeated in the 1991 Democratic Party primary by Antonio Pagán, the first openly gay politician to represent the district. Pagán's conservative stances and support for Mayor Rudy Giuliani alienated large segments of his liberal-leaning constituency. In 1997, Pagán launched an unsuccessful campaign for Manhattan Borough President; he was succeeded on the council by Margarita López. In 2005, Rosie Méndez succeeded López, and was re-elected in 2009. Carlina Rivera succeeded Méndez in 2017, becoming the district's first straight councilmember in well over two decades.

References

New York City Council districts